Make Way may refer to:

 Make Way (Charlie Winston album), 2007
 Make Way (The Kingston Trio album), 1961
 "Make Way", a song by Aloe Blacc, 2018
 "Make Way", a song by Lizzo from Lizzobangers, 2013
 "Make Way!" (Ōban Star-Racers), a 2006 television episode

See also
 "Make a Way", a song by Blondie, 2014
 Make a Way (EP), by One Sonic Society, 2015